Southern Stove Works is a historic factory complex located in the Three Corners District of Richmond, Virginia.  The complex includes four contributing red brick buildings built between 1902 and 1920.  The buildings housed the foundry, assembly operations, warehouse storage, and metal storage.  In 1920, Southern Stove Works vacated the buildings and moved to their new facility, Southern Stove Works, Manchester.  By 1921, these buildings were occupied by the J. P. Taylor Leaf Tobacco Company (later Universal Leaf Tobacco Company).

It was listed on the National Register of Historic Places in 2005.  The building has been converted into tiny apartments.

See also 
 Dortch Stove Works: NRHP-listed stove factory in Franklin, Tennessee
 Woods–Evertz Stove Company Historic District: NRHP-listed stove factory in Springfield, Missouri

References

External links 
 Southern Stove Lofts

Industrial buildings and structures on the National Register of Historic Places in Virginia
Industrial buildings completed in 1902
Buildings and structures in Richmond, Virginia
National Register of Historic Places in Richmond, Virginia
Stoves
Apartment buildings in Virginia